Republic is an investment platform headquartered in New York City that allows individuals to invest in startups, growth-stage pre-IPO companies, real estate, video games, and crypto companies (despite the crackdown on fraudulent initial coin offerings in 2018).

Overview 
Republic was founded by Kendrick Nguyen, Paul Menchov and Peter Green in 2016 - as a spin-off from AngelList. The platform has deployed over $500 million in investments.

In November 2020, Republic launched the Republic Cities program in Dallas to fundraise for companies in Dallas from the local community.

In 2021, Everyrealm (at the time, Republic Realm), formerly a metaverse real estate investment channel of Republic, purchased a parcel of virtual land in Decentraland for close to one million US dollars. The lot has turned into a virtual shopping district & houses JPMorgan's lounge. 

Republic has its own profit-sharing digital security token, the Republic Note  - but has not minted the tokens or made any new developments since launching.

On October 19th, 2021, Republic announced a $150M Series B round led by Valor Equity Partners.

Republic Capital - its venture arm, has invested in notable companies - like  Carta, Dapper Labs, Klarna,  Kraken, Pipe, and  Plaid.

Acquisitions 
In June 2019, Republic acquired SheWorx, a company that helps female entrepreneurs raise capital. Lisa Wang - the founder - has since left Republic.

In April 2020, Republic acquired Fig, a video game crowdfunding platform. The first offering from Fig that was co-hosted by Republic is that of Intellivision Amico. Despite its fundraising success - to the tune of $39 million across multiple campaigns (including one on competitor site  StartEngine), it has faced multiple delays and remained in development up until July 2022.

In June 2020, Republic made an acqui-hire for Compound, a real estate investment platform to create Republic Realm. However, the division later spun off & rebranded as Everyrealm. In October 2022, a sexual harassment & racial discrimination lawsuit was filed against Everyrealm & Republic.

In November 2020 acquired certain assets of NextSeed, a local crowdfunding platform.

In December 2021, Republic entered into an agreement to acquire British equity crowdfunding business Seedrs for $100 million - in an effort to expand to Europe. This acquisition has faced pushback from regulatory bodies & the Seedrs investor base - citing preferential treatments given to large shareholders.

References 

Financial technology companies
Equity crowdfunding platforms